These are the 22 teams and 198 cyclists who participated in the 2011 Vuelta a España, which started on August 20th and finished on September 11th:

See also 
 Vuelta a España 2011

References

External links 
 

2011 Vuelta a España
2011